Oscar Altamirano (born January 9, 1978 in Buenos Aires) is a retired Argentine footballer who played as a forward. His last team was Justo José de Urquiza from the Argentine Primera B Metropolitana.

References

 Profile at BDFA 

1978 births
Living people
Footballers from Buenos Aires
Argentine expatriate footballers
Argentine footballers
Ferro Carril Oeste footballers
Racing de Olavarría footballers
Deportivo Pasto footballers
Universidad de Concepción footballers
Rivadavia de Lincoln footballers
Central Norte players
Chacarita Juniors footballers
Club Almagro players
Chilean Primera División players
Expatriate footballers in Chile
Expatriate footballers in Colombia
Association football forwards